Jaiden Anthony Watson (January 25, 1998), better known by his stage name NorthSideBenji, is a Canadian rapper and musician from Brampton, Ontario. Benji gained recognition from his Certified Gold single "Levels", which featured Toronto rapper Houdini. The single was released in December 2018, and was the only supporting single of his debut extended play, Caviar Dreams, which was released on January 18, 2019. He released his second EP Frienemy on September 6, 2019.

Career
NorthSideBenji began rapping in 2016 where he released numerous freestyles and songs. He released several singles and built a digital following of over 33,000 fans. He is independently signed to Music 4 Life. He released the single "Again" on October 31, 2017, and "Confessions" on December 11, 2017.
 He released a Fire In The Booth freestyle session with Charlie Sloth on January 6, 2018. In early 2018, he announced that he is working on his debut EP, titled Caviar Dreams, which was due to be released in July 2018, however, the album was delayed and was officially released on January 18, 2019. He released the third single of the EP "Levels" featuring Houdini on January 25, 2019. In which it speaks of the heart of getting out of their current circumstances and living a life of "Caviar Dreams" Erin Lowers of Exclaim! describes Caviar Dreams as "mellow in its approach, but captivating in its deliveries" and gave it an 8 out of 10. He was listed as one of 15 Toronto rappers you should know by XXL.

He released his second Fire in the Booth session on August 26, 2019, which featured support from rapper Nines, The freestyle was released in promotion of his sophomore EP, Frienemy, which was released on September 6, 2019, with five tracks.  Frienemy was described on the iTunes store as a "more succinct, in-your-face statement than its slow-burning predecessor, Caviar Dreams". The music video for the title track was released on September 29, 2019, on the British music website platform GRM Daily. NorthSideBenji also supported Canadian singer-songwriter Neena Rose on the single "Secret" released in October, 2019. He also made an appearance on the lead single "Too Soft" alongside Houdini in 6ixbuzz's second compilation album NorthernSound released on December 13, 2019.

His single "Levels" was Certified Gold by Music Canada on April 7, 2020.

He is featured on the tracks "Don't Change" and "Flex" on Nines' third studio album Crabs in a Bucket, which reached number one on the UK Albums Chart.

Discography

Compilation albums

Extended plays

Singles

As lead artist

As a featured artist

Awards and Nominations

|-
| rowspan="2"| 2022
| "30'000" (with DJ Charlie B)
| Juno Award for Rap Single of the Year
|
|-
| The Extravagant Collection
|Juno Award for Rap Album of the Year
|
|}

References

External links
 

Living people
1998 births
21st-century Canadian rappers
Black Canadian musicians
Canadian hip hop singers
Canadian male rappers
Musicians from Brampton
21st-century Canadian male musicians